Ewoud Pletinckx (born 10 October 2000) is a Belgian footballer who plays as a centre back for OH Leuven.

Club career
Pletinckx joined the youth academy of Zulte Waregem in 2012. Pletinckx made his professional debut with Zulte Waregem in a 2-1 Belgian First Division A loss to Antwerp on 19 January 2019.

International career
Pletinckx is a youth international for Belgium, and represented the Belgium U19s in 2018.

Career Statistics

References

External links

Essevee Profile

2000 births
Living people
Belgian footballers
Belgium youth international footballers
Association football defenders
S.V. Zulte Waregem players
Oud-Heverlee Leuven players
Belgian Pro League players